Funky Technician is the debut album by the American hip hop artists Lord Finesse and DJ Mike Smooth, released in 1990 on Wild Pitch Records. It was produced by Smooth, DJ Premier, and Diamond D and Showbiz. In 1998, the album was selected as one of The Sources 100 Best Rap Albums. In 2008, the album was re-released on Wild Pitch Records.

Critical reception
AllMusic called the album "an excellent LP of battle rap with Lord Finesse simultaneously claiming and proving his immense skills over a set of funky backing tracks."

Track listing

Charts

References

External links
 Funky Technician at Discogs

1990 debut albums
Albums produced by DJ Premier
Albums produced by Showbiz (producer)
Albums produced by Diamond D
Lord Finesse albums
Wild Pitch Records albums